This is the discography of English rock band Half Man Half Biscuit.

Albums

Studio albums

Compilation albums

EPs

Singles

Other charted songs

Miscellaneous tracks
"David Wainwright's Feet"; on the charity album Colours Are Brighter (2006)

Notes

References

Discographies of British artists
Rock music group discographies